Sir John Charles Fox (1855 – 1943), eldest son of John Fox, solicitor, was born on 29 May 1855. In 1880, he married Mary Louisa, second daughter of John Sutherland Valentine, C. E. Fox had three sons and three daughters. He liked to play golf. He was educated at Kensington Grammar School. He was admitted a solicitor in 1876 and was a member of the firm Hare and Co., agents for the Treasury Solicitor, from 1881 to 1891. He became a Chief Clerk in the Chancery Division in 1891, the title of this office being changed to Master in 1897. He became Senior Master in 1917 and retired in 1921. He was knighted in the New Year Honours of 1921.

He was one of the editors of the Yearly Supreme Court Practice. He is the author of Handbook of English Law Reports (1913). It is a "detailed monograph". Fox was also author of The History of Contempt of Court (Clarendon Press, Oxford, 1927; reprinted by Professional Books, London, 1972).

References
Sir John Charles Fox. National Portrait Gallery.
Debrett, John. "Fox, Sir John Charles" in Debrett's Baronetage, Knightage, and Companionage. Dean & Son Ltd. 1931. Page 1018. 
Alberta Chamberlain Lawrence. "Fox, John C(harles)" in Who's Who among living authors of older nations. Golden Syndicate Publishing Co. Los Angeles. 1932. Page 162. Google Books
L G Pine, Edward Martell and Alberta Lawrence. "Fox, Sir John Charles" in Who was who among English and European authors, 1931-1949. Gale Research Co. 1978. Page 527. Google Books
"Sir John Fox" in "Obituary" (1943) 87 Solicitors Journal 110 Google Books
"Sir John Fox" in "Obituary" (1943) 195 Law Times 130 Google Books
"Sir John Fox" (1943) 93 Law Journal 97 Google Books
"Sir John C. Fox" (1921) 65 Solicitors Journal 773 Google Books

1855 births
1943 deaths
English solicitors